Cornelius Elst (25 January 1901 – 2 November 1969) was a Belgian footballer. He played in five matches for the Belgium national football team from 1922 to 1928.

References

External links
 

1901 births
1969 deaths
Belgian footballers
Belgium international footballers
Place of birth missing
Association football midfielders